Jizhong Zhou is an American biologist, currently George Lynn Cross Research Professor and Presidential Professor at University of Oklahoma and an Elected Fellow of the American Association for the Advancement of Science and American Academy of Microbiology.

References

Year of birth missing (living people)
Living people
University of Oklahoma faculty
21st-century American biologists
Washington State University alumni
Michigan State University alumni
Fellows of the Ecological Society of America